Anthony L. Weeden Jr. (born July 25, 1982) is an American professional basketball player. He is a 184 cm (6 ft 1in)  guard. He played competitively at Emmerich Manual High School before transferring to Pike High School where they brought home the 2001 National Championship.

Professional career
His career began in 2005 where he played in the United States and then Canada. He then transitioned to Syria, and in 2007 signed a contract with Polpharma Starogard Gdansk. Weeden began the 2008 season in Silesia, Wroclaw and after the withdrawal of the club with PLK, Weeden went on to play in Kwidzyn. In 2009, he returned to Polpharma where he led his team to the Polish Championships and took home the Bronze Medal. Weeden was selected for the 2010 Polish All Star Game and in the summer of 2010, Weeden signed to Marousi BC in the tough and physical Greek First Division (Athens, Greece).

College career
Weeden was the Mid-Continent 2003-04 All-Newcomer Team Member. He led his team in steals in that same year, led his team in 3pts made for four straight seasons, and ranked 10th on the All-Time scoring list at Chicago State University (NCAA).

Awards and accomplishments
2010: Playoffs Bronze Medal Recipient
Selected for the PLK All-Star Game
Selected for the Import Stars vs. Polish National Team

2008: Kentucky Pro-Am All Tournament

2007: Led Team in Free-Throw Percentage

2006: ABA All-Star Game Nominee

2005: Led Team in 3pts made & minutes played
Ranked 10 in CSU's All-time scoring list (803pts)

2004:Led team in steals (47)
NCAA Mid-Con All Newcomer Team
NCAA All Mid-Con Conference Honorable Mention
NCAA Mid-Con Conference Tournament Semi-finals

2002:  Freshman of the year
First team All-Conference

References

External links
 Court Side Agency
 Tony Weeden Web
 Highlights
 EuroBasket

1982 births
Living people
American expatriate basketball people in Bulgaria
American expatriate basketball people in Canada
American expatriate basketball people in Cyprus
American expatriate basketball people in Greece
American expatriate basketball people in Iran
American expatriate basketball people in Italy
American expatriate basketball people in Lebanon
American expatriate basketball people in Poland
American expatriate basketball people in Syria
American men's basketball players
Siarka Tarnobrzeg (basketball) players
Basketball players from Chicago
Chicago State Cougars men's basketball players
Greek Basket League players
Keravnos B.C. players
KK Włocławek players
Maroussi B.C. players
Pallacanestro Varese players
PBC Academic players
Śląsk Wrocław basketball players
Wabash Valley Warriors men's basketball players
Guards (basketball)